Amy Elizabeth Sannes (born February 3, 1977, in St. Paul, Minnesota) is an Olympic speed skater who competed in the 1998 Winter Olympics, 2002 Winter Olympics and 2006 Winter Olympics.

She graduated in 2004 from the University of Utah with a degree in exercise physiology.

References
 Amy Sannes at NBC Olympics
 U.S. Speedskating profile

External links
 
 
 

1977 births
Living people
American female speed skaters
University of Utah alumni
Speed skaters at the 1998 Winter Olympics
Speed skaters at the 2002 Winter Olympics
Speed skaters at the 2006 Winter Olympics
Olympic speed skaters of the United States
21st-century American women